Cornelius White is the name of:

Cornelius White (American football)
Cornelius White (boxer)
Cornelius White (footballer)
Cornelius White (politician)